is a Japanese autobiographical manga series written by  and illustrated by . It was serialized in Shogakukan's seinen manga magazine Monthly Ikki from February 2005 to May 2009. The manga is based on Mizutani's autobiographical book of the same title published in 2004.

Synopsis
Osamu Mizutani is a high school teacher who works in a night school in Yokohama. He spends the nights staying by the side of vulnerable, recluse and addicted to drugs teenage runaway students who have been rejected by society. Mizutani encounters with them to help and counsel, becoming known as the "Night Patrol Teacher".

Publication
Written by Osamu Mizutani and illustrated by Seiki Tsuchida, Yomawari Sensei is based on Mizutani's autobiographical book of the same title, released by Sanctuary Publishing on February 10, 2004 (re-released by Shogakukan on March 6, 2009). A previous story, subtitled , was published in Shogakukan's seinen manga magazine Monthly Ikki on October 25, 2004; it was released as a collected volume on December 28, 2004.

Yomawari Sensei was serialized in Monthly Ikki from February 25, 2005, to May 25, 2009. Shogakukan collected its chapters in nine tankōbon volumes, released from September 30, 2005, to January 30, 2009; an additional volume was released on May 29, 2009. Tsuchida died of liver cirrhosis on April 24, 2012. An additional story of Yomawari Sensei, subtitled , was released on June 29, 2012; it contains three chapters of a planned four-chapter unfinished story and contributions by other manga artists.

The manga was licensed in France by Casterman, released under its imprint Sakka, and in Indonesia by M&C!.

Volume list

See also
 Henshū Ō, another manga series by Seiki Tsuchida
 Onaji Tsuki wo Miteiru , another manga series by Seiki Tsuchida

Notes

References

Further reading

External links
  
 

Autobiographical anime and manga
Drama anime and manga
Seinen manga
Shogakukan manga